Eugene Wyman Ford (April 16, 1881 – August 23, 1973) was a Canadian professional baseball player. He was a right-handed pitcher who appeared in Major League Baseball (MLB) during 1905 with the Detroit Tigers. With Detroit, he compiled a 0–1 record, with a 5.66 earned run average, and 20 strikeouts in 35 innings pitched. Ford also played professionally in several minor leagues between 1902 and 1908.

His brother Russ Ford was also a major-league pitcher.

External links

1881 births
1973 deaths
Baseball people from Nova Scotia
Birmingham Barons players
Canadian expatriate baseball players in the United States
Des Moines Boosters players
Detroit Tigers players
Indianapolis Indians players
Major League Baseball pitchers
Major League Baseball players from Canada
Minneapolis Millers (baseball) players